The 1879 Columbia football team represented Columbia University in the 1879 college football season.

Schedule

References

Columbia
Columbia Lions football seasons
College football winless seasons
Columbia football